Eric McClellan (born April 6, 1993) is an American professional basketball player who last played for Kapfenberg Bulls. A 6 foot 4 inch (1.93 meter) shooting guard, McClellan played college basketball for Tulsa, Vanderbilt and Gonzaga. McClellan entered the 2016 NBA draft but was not selected in the draft's two rounds.

High school career
McClellan played high school basketball at Stephen F. Austin. As a junior at Stephen F. Austin, he led his team to a 29-4 record and the District 15-5A championship his senior season, where he averaged 18.9 points, 6.4 rebounds and 4.8 assists per game.

College career
McClellan chose Tulsa to start his college career. As a freshman, he averaged 8.5 points and 2.5 rebounds in 21.3 minutes per game. After one year at Tulsa, he transferred to Vanderbilt, where he became the starting guard of the team during the 2013-14 season. As a sophomore at Vanderbilt, he averaged 14.2 points and 4.4 rebounds per game, and led the team in scoring. On January 10, 2014, McClellan was suspended for the rest of the season after violating academic policy and was dismissed from Vanderbilt.

The next season, he transferred to Gonzaga, where as a junior, he was a role player for Mark Few. As a senior, he gained more playing time after the departure of Kevin Pangos from the team. At the end of the season, he averaged 10.7 points, 2 assists and 3.2 rebounds in 26.9 minutes per game.

Professional career
After going undrafted in the 2016 NBA draft, McClellan joined Limburg United of the Belgian League. After averaging 14.2 points and 3 rebounds per game in 5 league games, he left Limburg and joined Tigers Tübingen of the Basketball Bundesliga. On February 21, 2017, he left Tigers Tübingen and joined Koroivos Amaliadas of the Greek Basket League, replacing D'Vauntes Smith-Rivera on the team's squad.

On November 19, 2020, he joined Kapfenberg Bulls of the Austrian Basketball Bundesliga. With Bulls, he managed to win the Austrian League in 2019 and the Austrian Cup twice, in 2019 and 2020. On November 30, 2020, he terminated his contract with the club.

References

External links
Eric McClellan at gozags.com

1993 births
Living people
American expatriate basketball people in Belgium
American expatriate basketball people in Germany
American expatriate basketball people in Greece
Basketball players from Mississippi
Gonzaga Bulldogs men's basketball players
Koroivos B.C. players
Limburg United players
Shooting guards
Tulsa Golden Hurricane men's basketball players
Vanderbilt Commodores men's basketball players
Tigers Tübingen players
American men's basketball players